The People's Crusade Labour Party (PLKP), sometimes referred to as simply Laboral, was a political party in Curaçao founded in 1997. It was known as the party of the labour unions.

By obtaining 1019 registrations of support, the party qualified (a minimum of 743 was required) for participation in the Curaçao General Election of 2012 on 19 October in a combined list with the Democratic Party (DP), named Partido Democrat Laboral (Democratic Labour Party). The group obtained 1.2% of the votes which was insufficient for a seat.

Netherlands Antilles
The party was founded as the labour unions wanted to have a say in politics of Curaçao. At the legislative elections in the Netherlands Antilles, 18 January 2002, the party won 12.1% of the popular vote of Curaçao and 2 out of 22 seats in the Estates of the Netherlands Antilles.  At the elections of 27 January 2006, the party lost parliamentary representation in the Netherlands Antilles.

References

Labour parties
Political parties in Curaçao
1997 establishments in the Netherlands Antilles
Political parties established in 1997
Social democratic parties in the Netherlands
Workers' rights organizations